Alistair Kim Bruce-Lockhart (16 June 1946 – 15 January 1980) was a Scottish professional squash player from the Bruce Lockhart family.

Bruce-Lockhart was born in Woking, Surrey, England, the son of educationist Rab Bruce Lockhart, who played rugby for Scotland. His grandfather John Bruce Lockhart was a dual rugby-cricket international for Scotland and headmaster of Sedbergh School. His uncle Logie was also a Scottish rugby international while his great-uncle Sir Robert Hamilton Bruce Lockhart was a diplomat, spy and rugby footballer.

From age 4 to 8, he lived in Ontario, Canada, before moving to Wanganui, New Zealand, and eventually returning to the United Kingdom. He was educated at Sedbergh School and St John's College, Cambridge, where he read Medieval and Modern Languages. After receiving coaching from Dick Hawkey he began playing squash for Cambridge and the Hampstead Club. In 1968, he was capped by Scotland and played 59 times for his country. He participated in the British Open Squash Championships from 1970 until 1979.

A blog by John Winn on Cricket Heritage described him as follows:

"An outstanding squash player who, after Sedbergh School, went up to Cambridge where he gained a Blue for squash, played a decent standard of cricket, 'a shrewd captain, an erratic spin bowler, and a superb batsman with an impeccable defence and an enthralling array of wristy attacking strokes' - qualities that earned him selection for Surrey II and should, some thought, have gained him a Blue. He captained the first XV at Sedbergh, a team that included Alastair Biggar and John Spencer, and of course the cricket team for which Wisden shows he was outstanding with both bat and ball. He was No 1 for Scotland at squash for almost ten years until aged 33 he dropped dead from a heart attack while playing a Cumberland Cup game in January 1980,  leaving a wife and young family."

Bruce-Lockhart was buried in Harrow on the Hill, London.

References

External links
 

Scottish male squash players
1980 deaths
1946 births
Alumni of St John's College, Cambridge
Kim
People educated at Sedbergh School
Sportspeople from Woking